Stebuliai (formerly ) is a village in Kėdainiai district municipality, in Kaunas County, in central Lithuania. According to the 2011 census, the village had a population of 35 people.

It was a folwark till the mid-20th century.

Demography

References

Villages in Kaunas County
Kėdainiai District Municipality